Rocafort de Queralt is a municipality and village in the comarca of Conca de Barberà in the province of Tarragona in Catalonia, Spain.

The municipality has an area of 8.6 km. Its elevation is approximately 562m.

Economic activity is mainly agricultural, principally cereals, vines and wine, principally cava, a sparkling wine. In former times, Rocafort was an important centre for the production of saffron.

The town's origins are obscure, but its castle is mentioned in an 1178 document.

As of January 2012, the mayor of Sarral is Valentí Gual i Vilà.

References

External links
 Official website
 Government data pages 

Municipalities in Conca de Barberà